An expiration date or expiry date is a previously determined date after which something should no longer be used, either by operation of law or by exceeding the anticipated shelf life for perishable goods. Expiration dates are applied to selected food products and to some other manufactured products like infant car seats where the age of the product may impact its safe use.

The legal definition and usage of terms will vary between countries and products.
Different terms may be used for products that tend to spoil and those that tend to be shelf-stable. 
The term Use by is often applied to products such as milk and meat that are more likely to spoil and can become dangerous to those eating them.  Such products should not be consumed past the date shown.
The term Best before is often applied to products that may deteriorate slightly in quality, but are unlikely to become dangerous as a result, such as dried foods. Such products can be eaten after their Best before date at the discretion of the consumer. 
Storage and handling conditions will affect whether and when an item will spoil, so there is inherent variability in dating.

Arbitrary expiration dates are also commonly applied by companies to product coupons, promotional offers and credit cards. In these contexts, the expiration date is chosen for business reasons or to provide some security function rather than any product safety concern.
Expiration date is often abbreviated EXP or ED.

Terms

Use by

Generally, foods that have a use by date written on the packaging should not be eaten after the specified date. This term is generally applied to foods that may go bad due to physical instability,  chemical spoilage, bacterial spoilage, pathogenic spoilage, or other factors that can make the food injurious to health. Milk, meat, fish and eggs are all subject to spoilage. Such foods should be thrown away if past their use by date or if showing signs of deterioration such as changes in smell or color.   Fruits, vegetables, breads and other baked goods can also spoil, but may be less likely to become dangerous.  It is important to follow storage and preparation instructions carefully for perishable foods.  Some product may require refrigeration.  Others may need to be cooked to particular temperatures.

Bathroom products and toiletries usually state a time in months from the date the product is opened, by which they should be used. This is often indicated by a graphic of an open tub, with the number of months written inside (e.g., "12M" means use the product within 12 months of opening). Similarly, some food products say "eat within X days of opening".

Best before
 
Best before or best by dates appear on a wide range of frozen, dried, tinned and other foods. These dates are advisory and refer to the quality of the product, in contrast with use by dates, which may indicate that the product may no longer be safe to consume after the specified date. Food kept after the best before date will not necessarily be harmful, but may begin to lose its optimum flavour and texture. 

Eggs can be a special case, since they may contain salmonella which multiplies over time; they should therefore be eaten before the best before date.  In Britain, this is 21 days from when they were laid. In the USA, this is a maximum of 45 days after the eggs are packed.  Quality of the eggs will degrade over time, due to a variety of factors.  As a result, some prefer to use fresher eggs for eating and eggs a few days old for cooking.

Sometimes the packaging process involves using pre-printed labels, making it impractical to write the best before date in a clearly visible location. In this case, wording like best before see bottom or best before see lid might be printed on the label and the date marked in a different location as indicated.

Open dating
Open dating is the use of a date stamped on the package of a food product to help determine how long to display the product for sale. This benefits the consumer by ensuring that the product is of best quality when sold. An open date does not supersede a use-by date, if shown, which should still be followed.

By country

Europe
As of 2020, the European Food Safety Authority outlined a risk‐based approach for food business operators (FBO) to use in deciding the type of date marking to be used on different types of products, (i.e. ‘best before’ date or ‘use by’ date), determining a desirable shelf‐life (i.e. time) and identifying relevant content to be put on food labels to ensure food safety.

Great Britain 
Great Britain has established legislation for Food Information Regulations.  Best practices include the labeling of foods with either a ‘best before’ or a ‘use by’ date so that consumers can help to ensure the safety of their food and lessen the amount of consumer food waste.

Canada
An expiration date on food differs from a best-before date. According to the Canadian Food Inspection Agency "Expiration dates are required only on certain foods that have strict compositional and nutritional specifications which might not be met after the expiration date."

In Canada expiration dates must be used on the following food items (list and comments copied from
CFIA website):

formulated liquid diets (nutritionally complete diets for people using oral or tube feeding methods)
foods represented for use in a very low-energy diet (foods sold only by a pharmacist and only with a written order from a physician)
meal replacements (formulated food that, by itself, can replace one or more daily meals)
nutritional supplements (food sold or represented as a supplement to a diet that may be inadequate in energy and essential nutrients)
human milk substitutes (infant formula)

The concern is that after the expiration date has passed, the food may not have the same nutrient content as specified on the packaging and for the listed regulated products, the nutritional content is quite important. The CFIA recommends that food should be discarded and should not be bought, sold or eaten beyond the stated expiration date.  This contrasts with a best before date which is an indication of how long properly stored prepackaged food is expected to retain its "freshness, taste, nutritional value, or any other qualities claimed by the manufacturer." Passing a best before date is not necessarily a reason to discard the food. "Sell by" and "manufactured on" dates are related concepts that may guide the consumer.

Non-food items may also carry an expiration date. For example, in Canada, all children are required to be secured in an infant car seat while in a motor vehicle that is in motion. Users are required by law to follow manufacturer's directions. There is no specific law that requires an expiration date, but all Transport Canada approved car seats sold in Canada carry a manufacturer applied expiration date that ranges between 6 and 9 years from date of manufacture. The rationale is that car seats are subjected to heat, cold, sun exposure, abuse by the children, and long term storage between children, all of which can degrade the structure and function of the car seat and fail in a crash. Further, beyond the expiration date the manufacturer will no longer be monitoring the safety of the seat through testing. Transport Canada advises to destroy an expired car seat and dispose of it at a landfill or recycling facility, and never to give an expired seat to someone else or to charity.

United States
The Food and Drug Administration in the United States notes that "[a] principle of U.S. food law is that foods in U.S. commerce must be wholesome and fit for consumption". However, with the exception of infant formula, the United States government does not require or specify uniform terminology for use on food labels, the use of date labeling is entirely at the discretion of the manufacturer, and   dates on labels do not indicate product safety.  U.S. law does state that labels should be truthful and not misleading. Specific foods may be subject to regulations from the Food Safety and Inspection Service. 

Most U.S. expiration dates are used as guidelines based on normal and expected handling and exposure to temperature. Use prior to the expiration date does not guarantee the safety of a food or drug, and a product is not necessarily dangerous or ineffective after the expiration date. According to the United States Department of Agriculture, "canned foods are safe indefinitely as long as they are not exposed to freezing temperatures, or temperatures above 90 °F (32.2° C). If the cans look okay, they are safe to use. Discard cans that are dented, rusted, or swollen. High-acid canned foods (tomatoes, fruits) will keep their best quality for 12 to 18 months; low-acid canned foods (meats, vegetables) for 2 to 5 years". .

"Sell by date" is a less ambiguous term for what is often referred to as an "expiration date". Most food is still edible after the expiration date. A product that has passed its shelf life might still be safe, but quality is no longer guaranteed. In most food stores, waste is minimized by using stock rotation, which involves moving products with the earliest sell by date from the warehouse to the sales area, and then to the front of the shelf, so that most shoppers will pick them up first and thus they are likely to be sold before the end of their shelf life. This is important, as consumers enjoy fresher goods, and furthermore some stores can be fined for selling out of date products; most if not all would have to mark such products down as wasted, resulting in a financial loss.

The expiration date of pharmaceuticals specifies the date the manufacturer guarantees the full potency and safety of a drug. Most medications continue to be effective and safe for a time after the expiration date. A rare exception is a case of renal tubular acidosis purportedly caused by expired tetracycline. A study conducted by the U.S. Food and Drug Administration covered over 100 drugs, prescription and over-the-counter. The study showed that about 90% of them were safe and effective as long as 15 years past their expiration dates. Joel Davis, a former FDA expiration-date compliance chief, said that with a handful of exceptions - notably nitroglycerin, insulin and some liquid antibiotics - most expired drugs are probably effective.

Further reading
 Europe
 
 United States
    Includes a list of the many terms used in the United States food industry.
 Labuza, T. P., Szybist, L.,  Open dating of Foods, Food and Nutrition Press, 2001; other edition: Wiley-Blackwell, 2004,

References

Food safety
Drug safety

Product safety